Jason Steven Cummings (born 1 August 1995) is a professional footballer who plays as a striker for A-League Men club Central Coast Mariners. Born in Scotland, he represents the Australia national team, after previously representing Scotland at youth and senior international level.

Cummings started his professional career with Hibernian, making 16 appearances and scoring twice in the 2013–14 season. He was their top goalscorer over each of the next three seasons, scoring more than 20 goals each season, making him the first player to achieve this feat for over 50 years. These goals helped Hibs win the Scottish Cup in 2016 and promotion in 2017. He moved to Nottingham Forest in June 2017, but did not play regularly for their first team and was loaned to Rangers in January 2018, Peterborough United in July 2018 and Luton Town in January 2019.  After a spell with Shrewsbury Town, Cummings signed for Dundee in 2021 and with them he would once again gain promotion to the Scottish Premiership. In 2022 Cummings signed for Australian club Central Coast Mariners.

He made his first full international appearance for Scotland in November 2017, but subsequently made himself available for selection by Australia. Cummings made his first appearance for them in September 2022 and scoring.

Club career

Hibernian
Cummings grew up a Hearts fan and attended Tynecastle High School. He played for local boys team Hutchison Vale and then joined the Hearts youth program. After struggling with injuries, Cummings was released by Hearts in 2012. After an impressive season with Hutchison Vale he was signed by Hibernian in the summer of 2013. Cummings made his debut senior appearance for Hibernian in a Scottish Premiership match against Inverness Caledonian Thistle in November 2013. Cummings scored his first career goals on 21 May 2014, netting twice as Hibernian won 2–0 against Hamilton Academical in the first leg of the promotion/relegation play-off. Hibs lost the return match 2–0 and Cummings missed the decisive kick in the penalty shoot-out, which resulted in Hibs being relegated to the Scottish Championship.

Cummings won the SPFL Young Player of the Month award for September 2014, after his two goals helped Hibs to beat Rangers in Glasgow. On 16 February 2016, Cummings became the first Hibs player to score in four consecutive Edinburgh derbies for 42 years after scoring the winner against Hearts in a Scottish Cup 4th round replay. On 16 April 2016, Cummings missed a penalty kick with a Panenka attempt in the Scottish Cup semi-final against Dundee United, which ended goalless, although he later scored the winning kick in the penalty shoot-out. He then played the first 65 minutes of the final, assisting Anthony Stokes' opening goal as Hibs won 3–2 against Rangers.

During the 2016 close season, Cummings signed a new four-year contract with Hibs. Peterborough United offered Hibs £1.2 million for Cummings in August 2016, but this proposal was rejected. He netted the winner in a 1–0 win Tannadice on 10 March 2017, and in doing so became the first Hibernian player to score more than twenty goals in three successive seasons since Joe Baker between 1957 and 1961. On 15 April, Hibs clinched the title and achieved promotion back to the Scottish Premiership after beating Queen of the South 3–0 at Easter Road. Later that day, Cummings tweeted that they had fulfilled his promise to return the team to the top flight. Cummings was nominated by PFA Scotland in their Young Player of the Year and Championship Player of the Year awards for 2016–17.

Nottingham Forest
Cummings signed a three-year contract with Nottingham Forest on 17 June 2017, moving for an undisclosed fee. As part of the deal Cummings former clubs Heart of Midlothian and Hutchison Vale were awarded a solidarity fee, due to his youth development. He scored his first goal for Forest on his debut in a 2–1 EFL Cup win against Shrewsbury Town on 8 August 2017.

Rangers (loan)
Cummings was loaned to Scottish Premiership side Rangers in January 2018 for the rest of the season, with Rangers holding an option to make the transfer permanent. He made his competitive debut for the club on 24 January, in a 2–0 win against Aberdeen. Cummings was one of four players to make their first appearance for Rangers in that game. He scored his first goal for Rangers four days later, in a 2–1 win at Ross County. On 4 March, Cummings scored a hat-trick for Rangers in a Scottish Cup quarter-final against Falkirk.

Peterborough United and Luton Town (loan)
On 13 July 2018, Cummings moved on a season-long loan to EFL League One side Peterborough United. After a strong start, scoring six goals in his first five league games, Cummings began to struggle for goals and his loan was terminated by Peterborough on 30 January 2019.

Later that month, Cummings was loaned to League One leaders Luton Town. He scored his first goal for Luton on 6 April 2019, coming on as a substitute against Blackpool, netting an equaliser in the 86th minute with the game finishing 2–2.

Shrewsbury Town
On 2 September 2019, it was announced that Cummings had signed for League One side Shrewsbury Town for an undisclosed fee. He made his debut for the club on 14 September, coming on as a 68th-minute substitute for Daniel Udoh away at A.F.C. Wimbledon, and five minutes later, he scored the equaliser in a 1–1 draw. Cummings scored in wins against Southend United and Sunderland, but minor injuries and illnesses over Christmas 2019 meant he was largely used as a substitute during January 2020. On 26 January 2020, Cummings came off the bench to net twice in a 2–2 draw with Liverpool in the FA Cup fourth round.

Dundee 
On 28 January 2021, Cummings returned to Scotland to sign with Dundee, on a deal until the summer of 2022. Despite only joining in January, Cummings would finish the season as Dundee's joint-top league scorer, and played an important role in helping the club win the Premiership play-offs and gaining promotion to the Premiership.

On 31 July 2021, Cummings scored in Dundee’s first game back in the Scottish Premiership since the 2018–19 season in their 2–2 draw with St Mirren. In December 2021, Cummings was sent home from training after showing up unfit to train. Amid interest from A-League side Central Coast Mariners, Cummings left Dundee in January 2022.

Central Coast Mariners 
Cummings signed an 18-month contract with Central Coast Mariners in January 2022. He scored in his A-League Men debut against Sydney FC on 30 January 2022.

International career

Scotland
Cummings played for the Scotland under-19 and under-21 teams. He received his first call-up to the senior Scotland squad in November 2017, and made his first full international appearance in a friendly against the Netherlands.

Australia
Cummings is of Australian descent through his mother Tracey who was born in Perth, and is a dual citizen of the United Kingdom and Australia. In July 2019, Australia manager Graham Arnold said that he wanted Cummings to play for the Socceroos, which was still possible as he had only played two friendlies for Scotland. In September 2019, Cummings told The Sun newspaper he was considering switching from Scotland to Australia and had already spoken with Socceroos assistant manager Rene Meulensteen. Talks silenced for a while, however, when the COVID-19 pandemic struck. Cummings said in March 2021 that he hoped "Australia are still looking out for me, if I get the call I'll be over there in a heartbeat".

In September 2022, Cummings was selected in the Australian squad to play two friendlies against New Zealand. He made his debut and scored a penalty as a second-half substitute in the second match, in Auckland. In November 2022, he was named in Australia's squad for the 2022 FIFA World Cup. Cummings made his World Cup debut in Australia's opening match against France, coming on as a substitute in the 56th minute.

Career statistics

Club

International

Scores and results list Australia's goal tally first.

Honours
Hibernian
Scottish Cup: 2015–16
Scottish Championship: 2016–17

Luton Town
EFL League One: 2018–19

Dundee
Scottish Premiership playoffs: 2020–21

Individual
SPFL Young Player of the Month (2): September 2014, April 2015
Scottish Championship Player of the Month (2): October 2015, August 2016
PFA Scotland Championship Team of the Year (2): 2015–16, 2016–17
A-Leagues All Star: 2022

See also
List of association footballers who have been capped for two senior national teams
List of Australia international soccer players born outside Australia

References

External links

1995 births
Living people
Footballers from Edinburgh
Australian soccer players
Australia international soccer players
Scottish footballers
Scotland international footballers
Scotland youth international footballers
Scotland under-21 international footballers
Scottish people of Australian descent
Australian people of Scottish descent
Scottish Professional Football League players
Heart of Midlothian F.C. players
Lothian Thistle Hutchison Vale F.C. players
Hibernian F.C. players
Nottingham Forest F.C. players
Rangers F.C. players
Peterborough United F.C. players
Luton Town F.C. players
Shrewsbury Town F.C. players
People educated at Tynecastle High School
English Football League players
A-League Men players
Association football forwards
Dundee F.C. players
Central Coast Mariners FC players
Dual internationalists (football)
2022 FIFA World Cup players
Australian expatriate sportspeople in England